Adrien Truffert (born 20 November 2001) is a professional footballer who plays as a left-back for Ligue 1 club Rennes. Born in Belgium, he plays for the France national team.

Club career
On 28 May 2020, Truffert signed his first professional contract with Rennes. He made his debut for the club on 19 September 2020 against Monaco. He came on as a 41st minute substitute for Faitout Maouassa, and had an assist and scored the game-winning goal in his debut.

International career
Truffert was born in Belgium to French parents, and moved back to France at a young age. He made his international debut for France at the under-19 level on 9 October 2019 against England U19.

On 20 September 2022, Truffert received his first call-up to the France national team for two UEFA Nations League matches, replacing the injured Lucas Digne.

Career statistics

Club

International

References

External links
 
 

2001 births
Living people
Footballers from Liège
French footballers
France international footballers
France youth international footballers
Belgian footballers
Belgian people of French descent
Association football defenders
Ligue 1 players
Championnat National 3 players
C'Chartres Football players
Stade Rennais F.C. players